Sandy is a 1926 American silent drama film directed by Harry Beaumont and starring Madge Bellamy, Leslie Fenton, and Harrison Ford.

Cast
 Madge Bellamy as Sandy McNeil 
 Leslie Fenton as Douglas Keith 
 Harrison Ford as Ramon Worth 
 Gloria Hope as Judith Moore 
 Ben Bard as Ben Murillo 
 David Torrence as Angus McNeil 
 Lillian Leighton as Isabel McNeil 
 Charles Farrell as Timmy 
 Charles Coleman as Bob McNeil 
 Joan Standing as Alice McNeil

References

Bibliography
 Solomon, Aubrey. The Fox Film Corporation, 1915-1935: A History and Filmography. McFarland, 2011.

External links

1926 films
1926 drama films
Silent American drama films
American silent feature films
1920s English-language films
Fox Film films
Films directed by Harry Beaumont
American black-and-white films
1920s American films